William Frank Yeoman (December 26, 1927 – August 12, 2020) was an American college football player and coach. He served as the head football coach at the University of Houston from 1962 to 1986. In his tenure, he became the winningest coach in Houston Cougars football history, with an overall record of 160–108–8. Yeoman revolutionized offensive football in 1964 by developing the Veer option offense. Yeoman also played a prominent role in the racial integration of collegiate athletics in the South by being the first coach at a predominantly white school in the State of Texas to sign a black player. Yeoman's Cougars finished the season ranked in the top ten of the AP Poll four times and finished 11 times in the AP or UPI top 20.

Playing career
Yeoman played center for Army from 1946 to 1948 under head coach Earl Blaik. The 1946 team was 9–0–1 with a backfield of two Heisman Trophy winners: Glenn Davis and Doc Blanchard. Yeoman was a team captain in 1948 and chosen as a second-team All-American. The Army football teams in which he played compiled a combined 22–2–4 record.

Coaching career
From 1950 to 1953, Yeoman served in the United States Army. After his return from the Army, he became an assistant coach under Duffy Daugherty at Michigan State from 1954 to 1961.

Houston
After serving as an assistant coach for eight seasons at Michigan State, Yeoman was hired to become the head coach of the University of Houston Cougars in 1962. In his first year, Yeoman guided the team to a 7–4 record and a victory in the Tangerine Bowl. After a losing season in 1963, Yeoman began experimenting with a new offense named the Veer, which used a split-back alignment. Yeoman became the first head college football coach of a major program in the state of Texas to award a scholarship to an African American player. Warren McVea, from San Antonio, signed with UH on July 11, 1964.

Running the Veer offense, Houston led the nation in total offense for three consecutive years in the late 1960s, with averages of more than 400 yards per game each year. The 1968 offensive total was the highest in the country (42.5 points per game), and set an NCAA record. This average was aided in part by the Cougars' 100–6 victory over Tulsa that marked the last time that a team scored 100 points in a top-division college football game.

Houston joined the Southwest Conference in 1976, and the Cougars posted a 10–2 record that included a 30–0 win at rival Texas and a victory over Maryland in the 1977 Cotton Bowl Classic. Yeoman finished as the runner-up for the AFCA Coach of the Year award and won Coach of the Year in the state of Texas. During Yeoman's career, the Cougars won four Southwest Conference Championships (1976, 1978, 1979, 1984), and he earned a 6–4–1 record in bowl games including a win over Nebraska in 1980 Cotton Bowl Classic.

In 1986, allegations surfaced that illegal recruiting inducements and extra benefits had been tendered to UH football players. Yeoman was alleged to have handed out cash to players. Due in part to the investigation, Houston forced Yeoman to retire at the end of the season after a 1–10 campaign. 

Yeoman coached 46 All-Americans, and 69 players who later competed in the National Football League, during his career. Former Baylor head coach Art Briles also played for Yeoman at UH. In 1988, the NCAA slapped Houston with three years' probation for over 250 major violations in the latter part of Yeoman's tenure. The Cougars were banned from bowl games in 1989 and 1990 and kicked off live television in 1989. They were also limited to 15 scholarships for the 1989 season. The NCAA said that the penalties would have been even harsher (including being limited to 20 scholarships for 1990 and 50 paid recruiting visits for 1989) had Yeoman still been coach. As it turned out, the penalties that were imposed were harsh enough that the Cougars would need almost the entire decade of the 1990s to recover; they would only have two winning seasons from 1991 to 2004.

Later life and honors

Yeoman was inducted into the University of Houston Hall of Honor in 1998. The College Football Hall of Fame inducted Yeoman in 2001, and two years later the Texas Sports Hall of Fame named him as an inductee. Also in 2002, Yeoman received the Paul "Bear" Bryant Lifetime Achievement Award. Yeoman died on August 12, 2020, at the age of 92 from kidney failure and pneumonia.

Head coaching record

References

External links
 

1927 births
2020 deaths
American football centers
Army Black Knights football players
Houston Cougars football coaches
Michigan State Spartans football coaches
Texas A&M Aggies football players
College Football Hall of Fame inductees
United States Army officers
People from Daviess County, Indiana
Coaches of American football from Indiana
Players of American football from Indiana
Military personnel from Indiana
Deaths from kidney failure
Deaths from pneumonia in Texas